Miodentosaurus is a genus of thalattosaurian (a type of extinct marine reptile) from the Late Triassic of China. It is one of several thalattosaurs found in the Xiaowa Formation, also known as the Wayao Member of the Falang Formation. The genus name "Miodentosaurus" translates to "Few toothed-lizard" while the species name "brevis" means "short", in reference to its short snout.

Description 
Miodentosaurus is a thalattosaur, a group of marine reptiles with long, paddle-like tails and short legs with independently movable digits. Miodentosaurus is specifically an Askeptosauroid, a specific group of thalattosaurs with rather straight snouts. Despite being closely related to Askeptosaurus (a thalattosaur with a very long and toothy snout), Miodentosaurus had a quite short snout (shorter than the rest of the head) with only a few conical teeth on the premaxillae and dentaries. Although this snout configuration is not known in any other thalattosaurians, Miodentosaurus does share a number of other features with Askeptosauroids, such as having 10 neck vertebrae and a large pineal foramen.

Apart from its unique cranial features, Miodentosaurus also has characteristically flat front claws and the two specimens known were both more than four meters long, making it one of the largest thalattosaurs known.

History and specimens 
The holotype of Miodentosaurus brevis, NMNS 004727 / F003960, is a well-preserved and fairly complete articulated skeleton. It was discovered in the Carnian-age Xiaowa Formation (or Wayao Member of the Falang Formation) of China, where other thalattosaurs as Anshunsaurus huangguoshuensis and Concavispina biseridens were found. The skull and mandibles were the first elements described in 2007, while the postcranial skeleton was described in 2009.

An even more complete specimen, ZMNH M8742, was described in 2010. This specimen is one of the most complete thalattosaur skeletons known and also depicts pelvic, metatarsal, and coracoid features different from those of the holotype, showing instances of individual variation within the genus.

References 

Thalattosaurs
Late Triassic reptiles of Asia
Triassic China
Fossils of China
Fossil taxa described in 2007
Prehistoric reptile genera